Tensing Pen Resort is located on the western tip of Jamaica in the town of Negril. It was founded in the early 1970s as a haven and retreat for young couples as a hippie hangout. It was purchased in 1975 by Karin and Richard Murray.

The Murrays sold the property in 1990, and it was subsequently purchased by Sam Petros in late 1992, who brought the Murrays back as partners. After the passing of Richard Murray in December 2016, Sam Petros became the sole owner of Tensing Pen Resort in March, 2017.

Over the years, Tensing Pen has become a small boutique resort known for honeymooners and destination weddings in Negril, Jamaica. It has also been referenced as a resort for singles due to the variety of activities and amenities available.

History of Tensing Pen 
Tensing Pen heralds its unique name from the former owners' (Stephen & Nicola Quinto) dog, Tensing. Tensing was found penned up when the former owners first rescued him. Thus, creating the name, Tensing Pen. After Tensing Pen was purchased by the Murray's, intense landscaping and renovations began shortly after in order to create the beginning shape of the resort.

After its repurchase by Sam Petros, further landscape work and new cottages were added. In 2004, Hurricane Ivan cleared the way to add a full-service restaurant, a lively bar, an organic swimming pool and a spa area, resulting in the resort that is standing today.

In September 2010, another renovation was completed, including the new thatched roofs and furnishings. The South House was also converted into the 2 bedroom 2 story cottage it is today.

In 2012, Tensing Pen was hit by the tremendous Hurricane Sandy that affected many islands in the Caribbean, including Jamaica
.

Unlike most resorts who offer easy access to typical electronics such as TV, wi-fi, and telephones, Tensing Pen's cottages and bungalows do not include any phones or electronics normally found in a resort. This is to provide the visitor with a unique experience away from the rest of the world. Wi-fi, telephone service, and other amenities are available at the front desk.

Activities at Tensing Pen

Snorkeling 
Snorkeling is a common activity at Tensing Pen. The water is very clear and there are multiple areas and depths in which to swim and snorkel by the resort. There are a variety of species of fishes including the Parrot Fish, Puffer Fish, and other marine animals like Stingrays that are native to the Caribbean Sea.

Beaches 
Tensing Pen is located along Jamaica's famous seven mile beach, Jamaica's longest and most pristine beaches. Tensing Pen Resort is located on cliffs next the Caribbean, offering more privacy for visitors.

Scuba Diving 
Scuba Diving is another common activity at Tensing Pen Resort and the surrounding Negril area.

Rooms 

Tensing Pen Resort has a total of 17 thatch and stone cottages spread around the resort. Cottages and Bungalows  are available on seaside cliffs, in the gardens, or further back with an ocean view.

 The Long House is the largest of the cottages available with 3 bedrooms and an ocean view.
 Red Birch Cottage has 3 large bedrooms and a living area with an ocean view. They can be booked separately or together for families.
 South House I and South House II are interconnected via an outside staircase and both have a large veranda.
 Rock Cottage I and Rock Cottage II are both one bedroom, private stone cottages located on the cliffs. Both have verandas.
 Cove Cottage is a one bedroom cottage located on the cliffs right above the water.
 The Pillars are a group of one bedroom cottages that simulate a tree house.
 The Pillars Suite is a one bedroom, larger version of The Pillars, with a veranda and ocean view.
 Seagrape I and Seagrape II are one bedroom stone cottages with an ocean view.
 The Patio is a two bedroom cottage with a garden view.
 The Bungalow is a one bedroom bungalow with a garden view and a large veranda.
 The Garden Cabin is a one bedroom cottage located in the garden areas and has a garden view.
 Garden A and Garden B are one bedroom cottages with a garden view. Garden A has a garden view facing the ocean, and has a small verandas. Garden B has a garden view and a small veranda.
 The Garden Studio is a one bedroom bungalow with a large veranda and an ocean view.
 Seagrape I and Seagrape II are both one bedroom suites, located on the cliffs. Both have verandas. Seagrape I is on the ground floor whereas Seagrape II is located on the second floor above it.
Coffee Rose Unit is a new addition to Tensing Pen, consisting of 3 independent suites. Coffee Rose I is located on the top with a large veranda overlooking the ocean, Coffee Rose II and II are on the lower level, with verandas overlooking sea and garden views.

Amenities

Dining 
Tensing Pen has an open air dining setting offering a free continental breakfast every morning to hotel guests, with more items à la carte. Lunch and dinners include Jamaican culinary creations.

Bar 
With the addition of an above water extension, Tensing Pen's Bar offers a variety of traditional and Jamaican-style cocktails, wines and beer. In addition, fresh coconuts are offered during season.

Yoga 
Tensing Pen offers Iyengar Yoga classes in the Seasong Hut every day of the week. Private classes are also offered upon request.

Spa 
Different types of wellness services such as Massages, Facials, and Body Scrubs are available in the Tensing Pen Spa.

References 

Resorts in Jamaica